Richard Sossi is a former member of the Maryland House of Delegates. He represented District 36, which covers Caroline, Cecil, Kent, and Queen Anne's Counties.

Education
Sossi graduated from the University of Colorado at Boulder in 1965 with a B.A. in Asian Studies.

Career
After college, Sossi joined the United States Navy, where he served from 1965 until 1970.  He did a tour in Vietnam, from 1966 until 1967, and served as Deputy Branch Chief for the National Security Agency from 1968 to 1970. While in the military, he graduated from the Defense Language Institute studying Chinese.  He also completed Officers' Cryptologic Course for the National Security Agency in 1969.

After the military, Sossi was a self-employed businessman, owning The Ship and Soldier Shop since 1977.  He was a member of the Queen Anne's County Republican Central Committee from 1990 until 1998. He has had the honor of serving as an alternate delegate to the Republican Party National Convention several times (1992, 1996, 2000).

In his community, Sossi is a member of the American Legion Post 278, the Elks Lodge, the Moose Lodge, the Vietnam Veterans of America, and the Coastal Conservation of America.  He also serves on the Cecil County Chamber of Commerce, the Queen Anne's County Chamber of Commerce, and Rotary International.

Family
Richard Sossi married Flora Schoolfield (Sossi) in 1970 and has one daughter, Yvette Sossi Kalkay, and one grandson, Armando Kalkay.

The Maryland General Assembly
He was first elected in 2003 and served along with fellow Republicans Michael D. Smigiel Sr. and Mary Roe Walkup. In 2002, he defeated Democratic incumbent Wheeler R. Baker for the seat in Queen Anne's County.  In 2002, the election for that district called for the voters to choose 3 from the slate, whereas in the 1998 election, the voters chose one delegate from each county.

In 2006, Sossi defeated Wheeler R. Baker again, this time with 53% of the vote.

As a member in the Maryland House of Delegates, Sossi was appointed to be the Deputy Minority Whip in 2007.  He serves on the Environmental Matters Committee (2003–2011) and numerous subcommittees including local government & bi-county agencies subcommittee, 2003–05; housing & real property subcommittee, 2003–05, 2007-; natural resources subcommittee, 2003-; affordable housing work group, 2004; housing for individuals with disabilities work group, 2004; natural resources & ethics subcommittee, 2005; land use & ethics subcommittee, 2006; agriculture, agriculture preservation & open space subcommittee, (2006–2011);  ground rent work group, (2006–2011); co-chair, abatement of drug-related nuisances work group, 2004); Chair, Queen Anne's County Delegation, (2003–2011). Member, Maryland Rural Caucus, (2003–2011); Maryland Legislative Sportsmen's Caucus, (2003–2011); Maryland Veterans Caucus, (2005–2011); Member, Bainbridge Development Advisory Board, (2003–2011); Task Force on Traffic Capacity Across the Chesapeake Bay, 2005–06; Task Force to Study Visual Smoke and Evacuation Alarms for the Deaf and Hard of Hearing, 2005–06; J. DeWeese Carter Center Advisory Board, (2005–2011); Task Force to Study the Boating Industry in Maryland, (2007–2011).

Legislative notes
voted against the Clean Indoor Air Act of 2007 (HB359)
voted against in-state tuition for illegal immigrants in 2007 (HB6)
sponsored and voted for Veterans Advocacy and Education Act of 2006 (law)(HB3) (SB305)
sponsored and voted for Prohibition against Inflicting Unnecessary Suffering or Pain on Animals (regardless of ownership) 2006 (law)
voted against the Healthy Air Act in 2006 (SB154)
voted for slots in 2005 (HB1361)

Election results
2006 Race for Maryland House of Delegates – District 36 Queen Anne's County
Voters to choose one per county:
{|class="wikitable"
!Name
!Votes
!Percent
!Outcome
|-
|-
|Richard Sossi, Rep.
|19,450
|  53.4%
|   Won
|-
|-
|Wheeler R. Baker, Dem.
|16,950
|  46.6%
|   Lost
|-
|}

2002 Race for Maryland House of Delegates – District 36
Voters to choose three:
{|class="wikitable"
!Name
!Votes
!Percent
!Outcome
|-
|-
|Richard Sossi, Rep.
|19,098
|  19.0%
|   Won
|-
|-
|Michael D. Smigiel, Sr., Rep.
|19,216
|  19.1%
|   Won
|-
|-
|Mary Roe Walkup, Rep.
|28,230
|  28.0%
|   Won
|-
|-
|Wheeler R. Baker, Dem.
|17,575
|  17.5%
|   Lost
|-
|-
|James G. Crouse, Dem.
|16,329
|  16.2%
|   Lost
|-
|Other Write-Ins
|277
|  0.3%
|   
|}

1998 Race for Maryland House of Delegates – District 36 Queen Anne's County
Voters to choose one per county:
{|class="wikitable"
!Name
!Votes
!Percent
!Outcome
|-
|-
|Wheeler R. Baker, Dem.
|17,109
|  55%
|   Won
|-
|-
|Richard Sossi, Rep.
|13,807
|  45%
|   Lost
|-
|}

References and notes

External links
http://www.msa.md.gov/msa/mdmanual/06hse/html/msa14003.html
http://www.mdp.state.md.us/redistrict/2002ld_courtappeals_62102_MD_map_web.pdf

1943 births
Living people
American businesspeople in retailing
Republican Party members of the Maryland House of Delegates
Politicians from New York City
People from Queen Anne's County, Maryland
United States Navy personnel of the Vietnam War
United States Navy officers
University of Colorado Boulder alumni
Defense Language Institute alumni
21st-century American politicians